Beckett on Film was a project aimed at making film versions of all nineteen of Samuel Beckett's stage plays, with the exception of the early and unperformed Eleutheria. This endeavour was successfully completed, with the first films being shown in 2001.

The project was conceived by Michael Colgan, artistic director of Dublin's Gate Theatre. The films were produced by Colgan and Alan Moloney for the Irish broadcaster RTÉ, the British broadcaster Channel 4 and the Irish Film Board. Each had a different cast and director, drawn from theatre, film and other fields.

Ten of the films were screened at the 2000 Toronto International Film Festival and some shown on Channel 4 television. On Wednesday, 6 February 2002, the series won the Best TV Drama award at the 6th The South Bank Show Award at the Savoy Theatre in London. The films never enjoyed a general cinematic release, but, in September 2001, all nineteen were screened at the Barbican Centre in London. They were also released in a number of videos and as a four-DVD box set, comprising a souvenir programme and numerous additional features.

A documentary video, titled Check the Gate: Putting Beckett on Film and directed by Pearse Lehane, was released on 5 February 2003.  It followed closely the project's work.

Credits

Waiting for Godot 
The play was originally published in 1952. Of directing the film version, Michael Lindsay-Hogg said, "Beckett creates an amazing blend of comedy, high wit and an almost unbearable poignancy in a funny yet heartbreaking image of man's fate. With the camera, you can pick those moments and emphasise them, making Beckett's rare and extraordinary words all the more intimate [...]. The play is about what it is about. Samuel Beckett would have said it's about two men waiting on the side of the road for someone to turn up. But you can invest in the importance of who is going to turn up. Is it a local farmer?  Is it God?  Is it salvation?  Or is it simply someone who just doesn't show up?

"The important thing is the ambiguity, the fact that it doesn't really state what it is. That's why it's so great for the audience to be part of it: they fill in a lot of the blanks; it works in their imaginations.

"For me, Beckett's view of the world is quite sadly accurate.  We are all really just bugs in the carpet."

The cast was composed of the following:

Vladimir: Barry McGovern
Estragon: Johnny Murphy
Pozzo: Alan Stanford
Lucky: Stephen Brennan
 The Boy: Sam McGovern
 Director: Michael Lindsay-Hogg
 Running Time: 2 hours

Endgame 
Original play published 1957.

Hamm – Michael Gambon
Clov – David Thewlis
Nagg – Charles Simon
Nell – Jean Anderson
Directed by Conor McPherson
Running Time – 1 hour 24 minutes

Happy Days 
Original play published 1960.

Winnie – Rosaleen Linehan
Willie – Richard Johnson
Directed by Patricia Rozema
Running Time – 1 hour 19 minutes

Act Without Words I 
Original play written 1956.

Mime – Sean Foley
Directed by Karel Reisz
Running Time – 16 minutes

Act Without Words II 
Original play written 1956.

A – Pat Kinevane
B – Marcello Magni
Directed by Enda Hughes
Running Time – 11 minutes

Krapp's Last Tape 
Original play written 1958.

Krapp – John Hurt
Directed by Atom Egoyan
Running Time – 58 minutes

Rough for Theatre I 
Original play written late 1950s.

A – David Kelly
B – Milo O'Shea
Directed by Kieron J. Walsh
Running Time – 20 minutes

Rough for Theatre II 
Original play written late 1950s.

A – Jim Norton
B – Timothy Spall
C – Hugh B. O'Brien
Directed by Katie Mitchell
Running Time – 30 minutes

Play 
Original play written 1963.

M – Alan Rickman
W1 – Kristin Scott Thomas
W2 – Juliet Stevenson
Directed by Anthony Minghella
Running Time – 16 minutes

Come and Go 
Original play written 1965.

Vi – Anna Massey
Ru – Siân Phillips
Flo – Paola Dionisotti
Directed by John Crow
Running Time – 8 minutes

Breath 
Original play written 1969.

Voice – Keith Allen
Directed by Damien Hirst
Running Time – 45 seconds

Not I 
Original play written 1972.

Auditor/Mouth – Julianne Moore
Directed by Neil Jordan
Running Time – 14 minutes

That Time 
Original play written 1975.

Listener and Voices – Niall Buggy
Directed by Charles Garrad
Running Time – 20 minutes

Footfalls 
Original play written 1975.

May – Susan Fitzgerald
Voice – Joan O'Hara
Directed by Walter Asmus
Running Time – 28 minutes

A Piece of Monologue 
Original play written 1980.

Speaker – Stephen Brennan
Directed by Robin Lefevre
Running Time – 20 minutes

Rockaby 
Original play written 1981.

Woman – Penelope Wilton
Directed by Richard Eyre
Running Time – 14 minutes

Ohio Impromptu 
Original play written 1981.

Reader and Listener – Jeremy Irons
Directed by Charles Sturridge
Running Time – 12 minutes

Catastrophe 
Original play written 1982.

P – John Gielgud
A – Rebecca Pidgeon
D – Harold Pinter
L – ? 
Directed by David Mamet
Running Time – 7 minutes

What Where 
Original play written 1983.

Bam – Sean McGinley
Bem, Bim and Bom – Gary Lewis
Directed by Damien O'Donnell
Running Time – 12 minutes

Criticism 
Reviews were generally laudatory. Michael Dwyer, film correspondent of The Irish Times, called it "commendably ambitious and remarkably successful, a truly unique collection".

References

Irish films based on plays
Samuel Beckett
Films directed by Anthony Minghella
English-language Irish films